Kadyrsha (Qaźırşa) is a rural locality (a village) in Sabyrovsky Selsoviet, Zilairsky District, Bashkortostan, Russia. The population was 105 as of 2010. There are 2 streets.

Geography 
Kadyrsha is located 54 km southeast of Zilair (the district's administrative centre) by road. Ashkadarovo is the nearest rural locality.

References 

Rural localities in Zilairsky District